Swimming Australia National Training Centre ("NTC") (formally the AIS Swimming Program) is an Olympic and Paralympic swimming scholarship program based at the Australian Institute of Sport. Set up as one of the eight founding program of the AIS in 1981 It is supported by the Australian Sports Commission under the Winning Edge 2012-2022 strategy and identified by Swimming Australia as a Podium Performance Centre.

The programs administration and swimming coaching services is run by Swimming Australia. The sports medicine, sports science and strength and conditioning services are provided by the AIS.

History
The National Training Centre programme replaces the AIS Swimming scholarship programme that ran from the AIS's formation in 1981. As well as the AIS Paralympic Program that ran between 2009 and 2011.

The Swimming Australia NTC scholarship program is funded by the Australian Federal Government, through the Australian Sports Commission. The program provides both residential and off-site living arrangement depending on the choice of the athlete. The program provides funding to those athletes who choose to live off-site.

The NTC program was set up as part of the Australian Sports Commission Winning Edge 2012-2022 strategy and officially replaced the AIS Swimming Program on January 1, 2014.

Current coaching staff include Tracey Menzies and Yuriy Vdovychenko. The program is managed by former AIS Swimming Scholarship holder Petria Thomas.

See also
 Australian Institute of Sport swimmers
 Australian Institute of Sport Paralympic swimmers

References

External links
Australian Institute of Sport alumni

Australian Institute of Sport
Swimming in Australia